Kenneth Dwayne Vaccaro (born February 15, 1991) is a former American football safety who played in the National Football League and founder and CEO of the Gamers First organization. They have teams in Halo and other major Esport titles. He was drafted by the New Orleans Saints in the first round of the 2013 NFL Draft and also played for the Tennessee Titans. He played college football at Texas. On December 1, 2021 he retired to pursue a career in Esports.

Early years
The eldest of four children, Vaccaro was born and raised in Brownwood, Texas by a widowed mother. He attended Brownwood High School before transferring to Early High School in nearby Early, Texas for his senior year and played football at both schools, earning all-district and all-state honors. While in high school he was moved around the field and played in six different positions. He also competed in athletics in both running and field events and had career-bests of 13.26 meters in triple jump and 6.48 meters in long jump.

College career
Vaccaro enrolled in the University of Texas at Austin, where he played for coach Mack Brown's Texas Longhorns football team from 2009 to 2012.

Freshman year

During his freshman year, Vaccaro appeared in all 13 games, both as a safety and on special teams. He made 1 tackle, blocked 1 punt and also forced a fumble in a game vs. Texas A&M. Texas ended the season with a 21-37 loss to Alabama. Vaccaro sacked quarterback Sam Bradford in the 2009 Red River Rivalry.

Sophomore year

In his sophomore year, Vaccaro saw more playing time in all 12 games with six starts: two games started as a safety and the other four as a nickleback. His best game of the year was against Oklahoma State where he caught his first college career interception. He had nine tackles (eight solo), one tackle for loss, and two pass breakups before the game was over. Vaccaro finished the season with 54 total tackles (42 solo), one interception, four tackles for loss, one forced fumble, and eight passes defended. The Longhorns had their first losing season (5–7) in 13 years.

Junior year

Vaccaro started all 13 games as a safety during his junior year and finished the season as a solid starter for the Texas Longhorns. He had 82 total tackles with 8 for a loss, 2.0 sacks, 8 pass breakups and 2 interceptions. In the Holiday Bowl, Vaccaro and his defense held the California Golden Bears to seven rushing yards and 195 yards of total offense. He had five tackles, two tackles-for-loss and a sack in the 21–10 victory.

Senior year

As a senior in 2012, Vaccaro was named a first-team All-American by Pro Football Weekly. He and linebacker Alex Okafor were voted as defensive captains for the season.

Professional career
Vaccaro attended the NFL Scouting Combine and completed all of the combine and positional drills. On March 26, 2013, Vaccaro participated at Texas' pro day, but did not perform any drills due to a hip injury. He attended private workouts and visits with a few teams, including the Dallas Cowboys, Tennessee Titans, New York Jets, Buffalo Bills, and New Orleans Saints. At the conclusion of the pre-draft process, Vaccaro was projected to be a first round pick by NFL draft experts and scouts. He was ranked as the top safety prospect in the draft by DraftScout.com, Sports Illustrated, and NFL analyst Mike Mayock.

New Orleans Saints
The New Orleans Saints selected Vaccaro in the first round (15th overall) of the 2013 NFL Draft. Vaccaro was the first safety drafted in 2013 and was the highest safety drafted from the University of Texas since Earl Thomas (14th overall) in 2010.

2013: Rookie year
On May 9, 2013, Vaccaro signed a fully guaranteed four-year, $9.42 million contract with a signing bonus of $5.23 million.

Throughout training camp, Vaccaro competed against Roman Harper to be the starting strong safety. Head coach Sean Payton named Vaccaro the backup strong safety behind Harper to start the regular season.

Vaccaro made his professional regular season debut and first NFL start in the Saints' season-opener against the Atlanta Falcons and made five solo tackles and deflected a pass intended for tight end Tony Gonzalez, which was caught by teammate Roman Harper on fourth down to seal a 23–17 victory. Vaccaro became the starting strong safety in Week 3 after Roman Harper sustained a knee injury. On September 22, 2013, Vaccaro recorded seven combined tackles, broke up a pass, and made his first career interception during a 31–7 win against the Arizona Cardinals in Week 3. In Week 5, he collected five solo tackles, deflected a pass, and made his first career sack on Jay Cutler in the Saints' 26–18 win against the Chicago Bears. In Week 10, Vaccaro made three solo tackles and a pass deflection before exiting in the third quarter after sustaining a concussion due to a knee colliding with his helmet while making a tackle during a 49–17 victory against the Dallas Cowboys. He remained in concussion protocol and was inactive for the Saints' Week 11 loss to the San Francisco 49ers. On December 22, 2013, Vaccaro was carted off the field during the first quarter of the Saints' 17–13 loss against the Carolina Panthers after breaking his ankle while making a tackle. On December 25, 2013, the Saints placed Vaccaro on injured reserve as he underwent ankle surgery.

Vaccaro finished his rookie season with 79 combined tackles (62 solo), eight pass deflections, a sack, a forced fumble, and an interception in 14 games and 14 starts. Vaccaro received an overall grade of 82.6 from Pro Football Focus and had the 13th highest grade among all qualifying safeties in 2013.

2014 season
Vaccaro entered training camp slated as the starting strong safety after Roman Harper departed for the Carolina Panthers during free agency. Defensive coordinator Rob Ryan named Vaccaro the starting strong safety to begin the regular season, along with free safety Jairus Byrd.

On October 19, 2014, Vaccaro made two combined tackles, a pass deflection, and an interception during a 24–23 loss against the Detroit Lions. The following week, he collected a season-high ten combined tackles (eight solo) during a 44–23 victory against the Green Bay Packers. Vaccaro was inactive for the Saints' Week 17 victory at the Tampa Bay Buccaneers due to a quadriceps injury. Vacarro finished his second season with 71 combined tackles (54 solo), five pass deflections, two interceptions, and a sack in 15 games and 14 starts. He received an overall grade of 42.8 from Pro Football Focus, which ranked as the 83rd highest grade among all qualifying safeties in 2014.

2015 season

Head coach Sean Payton retained Vaccaro and Jairus Byrd as the starting safeties in 2015. On November 16, 2015, the Saints decided to fire defensive coordinator Rob Ryan after a 48-14 loss against the Washington Redskins in Week 10. In Week 11, Vacarro collected a season-high 13 combined tackles (eight solo) and forced a fumble during a 24-6 loss against the Houston Texans. On December 27, 2015, Vaccaro recorded three solo tackles and made two sacks on Jaguars' quarterback Blake Bortles in the Saints' 38-27 win against the Jacksonville Jaguars in Week 16. Vaccaro started in all 16 games in 2015 and recorded a career-high 104 combined tackles (71 solo), five pass deflections, three sacks, and a forced fumble. Pro Football Focus gave Vaccaro an overall grade of 80.0, which ranked 21st among all qualifying safeties in 2015.

2016 season
On April 12, 2016, the Saints exercised the fifth-year option on Vaccaro's rookie contract and agreed to pay him $5.76 million for the 2017 season. Defensive coordinator Dennis Allen retained Vaccaro and Jairus Byrd as the starting safeties.

Vaccaro was inactive for the Saints' Week 3 loss to the Atlanta Falcons due to an ankle injury. On November 6, 2016, Vaccaro collected a season-high nine solo tackles during a 41–23 win at the San Francisco 49ers in Week 9. On November 10, 2016, it was reported that Vaccaro was facing a four-game suspension for violating the league's policy on performance-enhancing drugs for using Adderall and planned to appeal. In Week 10, Vaccaro made nine combined tackles, two pass deflections, an interception, and a sack during a 25–23 loss to the Denver Broncos. On December 9, 2016, Vaccaro dropped his plan to appeal and accepted the four-game suspension. He served his suspension and was inactive for the last four games of the 2016 season. He finished the season with 68 combined tackles (51 solo), five pass deflections, two forced fumbles, an interception, and a sack in 11 games and 11 starts. Pro Football Focus gave Vaccaro an overall grade of 79.9. His grade was the 38th highest among all qualifying safeties in 2016.

2017 season
Vaccaro entered training camp facing competition from Vonn Bell and rookie second-rounder Marcus Williams. Head coach Sean Payton named Vaccaro the starting strong safety to begin the regular season, alongside free safety Vonn Bell.

On October 15, 2017, Vaccaro recorded four combined tackles, a season-high three pass deflections, an interception, and scored a touchdown during a 52–38 victory against the Detroit Lions. During the first quarter, Vaccaro recovered a fumble in the end zone after Alex Okafor stripped it from quarterback Matthew Stafford. He missed two games (Weeks 10–11) after injuring his groin. In Week 15, he collected a season-high ten combined tackles (eight solo) during the Saints' 31–19 victory against the New York Jets. On December 21, 2017, the Saints officially placed Vaccaro on injured reserve due to a wrist and groin injury. Vaccaro had been playing with an injured adductor muscle that had torn off the bone and also required surgery to repair his wrist. Vaccaro finished the season with 60 combined tackles (48 solo), seven pass deflections, 3.5 sacks, a fumble recovery, and a touchdown in 14 games and 14 starts. Pro Football Focus gave Vaccaro an overall grade of 50.3, which ranked 114th among all the qualifying cornerbacks in 2017.

Tennessee Titans
On August 4, 2018, Vaccaro signed a one-year, $1.5 million contract with the Tennessee Titans after starting strong safety Johnathan Cyprien suffered a season-ending torn ACL.

2018 season
During the season-opener against the Miami Dolphins, Vaccaro recorded his first interception as a Titan by picking off Ryan Tannehill in the 27-20 loss. Two weeks later, he recorded his first sack of the season by sacking quarterback Blake Bortles in a 9-6 victory over the Jacksonville Jaguars. However, in the next game against the Philadelphia Eagles, Vaccaro suffered an elbow injury during the second quarter. He did not return and the Titans won by a score of 26-23 in overtime. On October 1, it was reported that Vaccaro had a dislocated elbow, which required him to miss two to four weeks.

Vaccaro finished the 2018 season with 58 tackles, two sacks, four pass deflections, and one interception.

2019 season

On March 11, 2019, Vaccaro signed a four-year, $26 million contract extension with the Titans with $11.5 million guaranteed.

During Week 11 against the Jacksonville Jaguars, Vaccaro recorded his first sack of the season by sacking Nick Foles in the fourth quarter. During Week 15 against the Houston Texans, Vaccaro recorded his first interception of the season off a pass thrown by Deshaun Watson in the 24–21 loss.

In the Divisional Round of the playoffs against the Baltimore Ravens, Vaccaro intercepted a pass thrown by Lamar Jackson during the 28–12 road victory.

2020 season
In Week 2 against the Jacksonville Jaguars, Vaccaro led the team with 11 tackles and made his first sack of the season on Gardner Minshew during the 33–30 win.

On March 10, 2021, Vaccaro was released by the Titans.

Retirement
On December 1, 2021, Vaccaro announced his retirement from the NFL along with the official launch of his esports organization, “Gamers First” (G1).

NFL career statistics

Regular season

Postseason

Personal life
Vaccaro's younger brother, Kevin, played for the Texas Longhorns football team from 2012 to 2016. Their uncle is retired cornerback and Super Bowl XXVI winner A. J. Johnson. Vaccaro traveled to Kenya during the 2016 offseason with former Texas and Saints teammate Alex Okafor and is involved in community and fundraising efforts to construct a school in the region. Vaccaro also founded the Kenny Vaccaro Foundation to provide economically-challenged students with literacy and education resources so that they can achieve academic excellence, develop confident personal skills, and make positive decisions to avoid high-risk behavior.

See also
List of Texas Longhorns football All-Americans

References

External links

New Orleans Saints bio
Texas Longhorns football bio
2013 NFL Draft Profile

1991 births
Living people
All-American college football players
American people of Italian descent
American football safeties
New Orleans Saints players
Tennessee Titans players
People from Brownwood, Texas
Players of American football from Texas
Texas Longhorns football players